Actinoleuca campbelli macquariensis is a subspecies of sea snail or true limpet, a marine  gastropod mollusc in the family Lottiidae, one family of true limpets.

References
 Powell A. W. B., William Collins Publishers Ltd, Auckland 1979 

Lottiidae
Gastropods of Australia
Gastropods described in 1916